The Basmala (also known by its incipit ; , "In the name of Allah"), or Tasmiyyah, is the titular name of the Islamic phrase "In the name of God, the Most Gracious, the Most Merciful" (Arabic:). It is one of the most important phrases in Islam and is used by Muslims mostly before starting "good deeds" (for instance, during daily prayer) as well as beginning of most daily actions. 

It is used in over half of the constitutions of countries where Islam is the official religion or more than half of the population follows Islam, usually the first phrase in the preamble, including those of Afghanistan, Bahrain, Bangladesh, Brunei, Egypt, Iran, Iraq, Kuwait, Libya, Maldives, Pakistan, 
Saudi Arabia, Tunisia and the United Arab Emirates.

It is the phrase recited before each chapter (surah) of the Qur'anexcept for the ninth. Muslim disagreement over whether to include the Basmala within the Quranic text, reached consensus following the 1924 Cairo Edition, which included it as the first verse (āyah) of Quran chapter 1 but otherwise included it as an unnumbered line of text preceding the other relevant 112 chapters.

The Islamic Basmala appears to be related to earlier variants of the phrase appearing in Arabian inscriptions from the 5th and 6th centuries. In Arabic calligraphy, the Basmala is the most prevalent motif, even more so than the Shahadah.

Name 
The traditional name for the phrase in Classical Arabic was Tasmiyah. Other common phrases in Islam were also given their own names based on verb form 2 verbal nouns, including Tasbih
The word basmala was derived from a slightly unusual procedure, in which the first four pronounced consonants of the phrase bismi-llāhi... were used to create a new quadriliteral root: b-s-m-l. This quadriliteral root was used to derive the noun basmala and its related verb forms, meaning "to recite the basmala". The method of coining a quadriliteral name from the consonants of multiple words in a phrase is also used to create the name '"Hamdala" for Alhamdulillah, instead of the traditional name of Tahmid. The same procedure is also used to create the term Hawqala.

Use and significance 

  
According to Lane,  has the more intensive meaning, taken to include as objects of "sympathy" both the believer and the unbeliever, and may therefore be rendered  as "the Compassionate";
, on the other hand, is taken to include as objects the believer in particular,   may be rendered as "the Merciful"  (considered as expressive of a constant attribute).

In the Qur'an, the Basmala is usually numbered as the first verse of the first sura, but, according to the view adopted by Al-Tabari, it precedes the first verse. Apart from the ninth sura ("At-Tawba"), Al-Qurtubi reported that the correct view is that the Basmala ignored at the beginning of At-Tawba because Gabriel did not refer to the Basmala in this surah, another view, says that Muhammad died before giving a clarification if At-Tawba is part of Quran 8 (al-ʾanfāl) or not. It occurs at the beginning of each subsequent sura of the Qur'an and is usually not numbered as a verse except at its first appearance at the start of the first sura. The Basmala occurs as part of a sura'''s text in verse 30 of the 27th sura ("An-Naml"), where it prefaces a letter from Sulayman to Bilqis, the Queen of Sheba.

The Basmala is used extensively in everyday Muslim life, said as the opening of each action in order to receive blessing from God. Reciting the Basmala is a necessary requirement in the preparation of halal food.

In the Indian subcontinent, a Bismillah ceremony is held for a child's initiation into Islam.

The three definite nouns of the Basmala—Allah, ar-Rahman and ar-Rahim—correspond to the first three of the traditional 99 names of God in Islam. Both ar-Rahman and ar-Rahim are from the same triliteral root R-Ḥ-M, "to feel sympathy, or pity".

The Basmala has a special significance for Muslims, who are to begin each task after reciting the verse. It is often preceded by Ta'awwudh.

Around 1980, IRIB used it before starting their newscasts.

 Hadith 

There are several ahadith encouraging Muslims to recite it before eating and drinking. For example:

Jabir reported: I heard Messenger of Allah (saw) saying, "If a person mentions the Name of Allah upon entering his house or eating, Satan says, addressing his followers: 'You will find nowhere to spend the night and no dinner.' But if he enters without mentioning the Name of Allah, Satan says (to his followers); 'You have found (a place) to spend the night in,' and if he does not mention the Name of Allah at the time of eating, Satan says: 'You have found (a place) to spend the night in as well as food.'"
— From Muslim

Aisha reported:  "The Prophet said, “When any of you wants to eat, he should mention the Name of God in the beginning (Bismillah).  If he forgets to do it in the beginning, he should say Bismillah awwalahu wa akhirahu (I begin with the Name of God at the beginning and at the end)".
— From At-Tirmidhi and Abu Dawud

Umaiyyah bin Makshi reported: "The Prophet was sitting while a man was eating food.  That man did not mention the Name of God till only a morsel of food was left.  When he raised it to his mouth, he said, Bismillah awwalahu wa akhirahu.  The Prophet smiled at this and said, "Satan had been eating with him but when he mentioned the Name of God, Satan vomited all that was in his stomach".
— From Abu Dawud and Al-Nasa'i

Wahshi bin Harb reported: "Some of the Sahaba of the Prophet said, 'We eat but are not satisfied.'  He said, 'Perhaps you eat separately.'  The Sahaba replied in the affirmative.  He then said, 'Eat together and mention the Name of God over your food.  It will be blessed for you.'
— From Abu Dawood

A tradition ascribed to Muhammad states:

All that is contained in the revealed books is to be found in the Qur’an and all that is contained in the Qur’an is summed up in the surat al-fatihah ("The opening one") while this is in its turn contained in the formula Bismillahi-r-Rahmani-r-Rahim ("In the name of God, the Compassionate, the Merciful").

A tradition ascribed to Imam Ali states:

The basmalah is in essence contained in the first letter, Ba, and this again in its diacritical point, which thus symbolizes principal Unity.

 Tafsir 

In a commentary on the Basmala in his Tafsir al-Tabari, al-Tabari writes:
“The Messenger of Allah (the peace and blessings of Allah be upon him) said that Jesus was handed by his mother Mary over to a school in order that he might be taught. [The teacher] said to him: ‘Write “Bism (In the name of)”.’ And Jesus said to him: ‘What is “Bism”?’ The teacher said: ‘I do not know.’ Jesus said: ‘The “Ba” is Baha’u'llah (the glory of Allah), the “Sin” is His Sana’ (radiance), and the “Mim” is His Mamlakah (sovereignty).”

 Numerology 

 Gematria 
According to the standard  Abjadi system of numerology, the total value of the letters of the Islamic Basmala, i.e. the phrase — is 786. This number has therefore acquired a significance in folk Islam and Near Eastern folk magic and also appears in many instances of pop-culture, such as its appearance in the 2006 song '786 All is War' by the band Fun^Da^Mental. A recommendation of reciting the basmala 786 times in sequence is recorded in Al-Buni. Sündermann (2006) reports that a contemporary "spiritual healer" from Syria recommends the recitation of the basmala 786 times over a cup of water, which is then to be ingested as medicine.

It has also become common to abbreviate the phrase by typing "786", especially in online communication, and especially among South Asian Muslims.

 Unicode 
In Unicode, the  Basmala is encoded as one ligature at code point U+FDFD  in the Arabic Presentation Forms-A block.

This character is single-handedly known as the widest character in Unicode in some situations.

 See also 

 List of Christian terms in Arabic
 Glossary of Islam
 Al-Fatiha
 Besiyata Dishmaya Bshuma in Mandaeism
 Deus vult and the Trinitarian formula in Christianity
 Inshallah Names of God in Islam
 Shahada Six Kalimas

 Notes 

 References 

Further reading

 External links 

Bismillah Samples, a collection of bismillah art-forms.
Bismallah in Tadabbur-i-Qur'an''.
Meaning of Bismillah
Beyond Probability, God's Message in Mathematics. Series 1: The Opening Statement of the Quran (The Basmalah).
The Blessed Basmala - Seeking a healing cure by means of Basmala, the pure

Islamic terminology
Arabic words and phrases
Al-Fatiha
Quranic verses
Arabic calligraphy
Religious formulas